Raymond D'Addario (August 18, 1920 – February 13, 2011) was an American photographer, known especially for his images of the Nazi leaders during the Nuremberg trials.

D'Addario worked as a freelance photographer from 1938, turning his hobby into his profession. He enlisted in the United States Army before it entered the Second World War; after the Japanese attack on Pearl Harbor, he was assigned to London as an army photographer. Selected to cover the Nuremberg trials along with other members of the military imaging service team, D’Addario was the most prolific of them. He had to face the restrictions for the taking of images imposed by the court, including among others not using a flash. The thousands of images he took, both in black and white and color, were those published in all international press coverage of the 21 defendants, some of them notable for starting their own discourse. Although his work was best known for his images of the defendant's bench, he also took singular images of the prosecutors, some silent motion pictures of the court itself, and the city of Nuremberg, devastated by the allied bombings in the war. Although he was discharged at the end of the trials of the Nazi leaders, D'Addario was called again to document other trials of the war crimes of more than 200 Nazis.

Selected works

 Nürnberg, damals, heute : 100 Bilder zum Nachdenken ("Nuremberg, Then and Today: 100 Images for Reflection"), 1970
 Der Nürnberger Prozess ("The Nuremberg Trial", with Klaus Kastner), 1994

Further reading

References

External links

 Nuremberg : Photos by Raymond D’Addario, permanent exhibit at the Robert H. Jackson Center in Jamestown, New York
 Ray(mond) D'Addario, Encyclopædia Britannica

1920 births
2011 deaths
Nuremberg trials
American photographers
People from Holyoke, Massachusetts
American war photographers